Ralph Jones (born January 20, 1944) is a former American stock car racing driver from Upton, Kentucky. Jones competed in 20 career NASCAR Winston Cup Series races between 1977 and 1988. Jones also competed in 16 ARCA events between 1985 and 1988, achieving 1 win, 8 top ten finishes, and 3 pole positions.

References

1944 births
Living people
NASCAR drivers
Racing drivers from Kentucky
People from Hardin County, Kentucky
People from LaRue County, Kentucky